Park Ye-jin (born April 1, 1981) is a South Korean actress.

Career 
Park Ye-jin made her acting debut in the 1999 horror film Memento Mori, then appeared in leading and supporting roles in several TV series and films, notably What Happened in Bali 2004, Dae Jo-yoeng 2006, and Again, My Love 2009 (also known as Hateful But Once Again). But her popularity increased when she became a regular cast member on the first season of variety show Family Outing, in which she showed a different image and earned the nickname "sweet, yet scary, Ye-jin." In 2009, Park left the show because of her hectic schedule filming the period drama Queen Seondeok 2009 and the movie Fortune Salon 2009.

After she was cast as Genghis Khan's wife Khulan in the Korea-China-Japan 3D martial arts pic An End to Killing 2013, Park starred in the fantasy romance I Love Lee Tae-ri 2012.

In November 2018, Park signed with Saram Entertainment.

Filmography

Films

Television series

Variety shows

Music videos

Awards and nominations

Listicles

References

External links 

1981 births
Living people
South Korean television actresses
South Korean film actresses
Chung-Ang University alumni
People from Seoul
20th-century South Korean actresses
21st-century South Korean actresses